Aeteidae is a family of bryozoans belonging to the order Cheilostomatida.

Genera:
 Aetea Lamouroux, 1812
 Callaetea Winston, 2008

References

Bryozoan families